Thomas Valentine Eddy (October 25, 1853 – 1918) was an American politician in the state of Washington. He served in the Washington House of Representatives from 1895 to 1897.

References

Republican Party members of the Washington House of Representatives
People from McHenry County, Illinois
1853 births
1918 deaths